Pachypleurum is a genus of flowering plants belonging to the family Apiaceae.

Its native range is Tibet to Southern Central China.

Species:

Pachypleurum muliense 
Pachypleurum nyalamense

References

Apioideae
Apioideae genera